Saint-Côme is a municipality in the Lanaudière region of Quebec, Canada, part of the Matawinie Regional County Municipality.

Demographics

Population

Private dwellings occupied by usual residents: 1319 (total dwellings: 2365)

Language
Mother tongue:
 English as first language: 1.4%
 French as first language: 96.7%
 English and French as first language: 0.4%
 Other as first language: 1.6%

Education

The Commission scolaire des Samares operates francophone public schools, including:
 École primaire de Saint-Côme

The Sir Wilfrid Laurier School Board operates anglophone public schools, including:
 Joliette Elementary School in Saint-Charles-Borromée
 Joliette High School in Joliette

See also
 Mont-Tremblant National Park

References

External links

Municipalities in Quebec
Incorporated places in Lanaudière
Matawinie Regional County Municipality